This is a selective list of the works of the German composer Simon Mayr  (1763–1845) who is credited with a total of some 600 compositions, including 70 operas.

Operas 

See List of operas by Simon Mayr

Other secular vocal music

Cantatas 

Femio, ossia La musica custode della fede maritale, cantata for three voices and orchestra, text by Francesco Boaretti, Venice, 1791
Ero, cantata for voice and orchestra, text by Giuseppe Foppa, Venice, 1793
Temira e Ariostoo, cantata for four voices and orchestra, Venice, 1795
Apelle e Campase, Venice, 1795 (lost)
Le sventure di Leandro, cantata for one voice, chorus and orchestra, text by Comtesse Velo, Vicenza, 1797
Traiano all'Eufrate, cantata for three voices, chorus and orchestra, text by Angelo Anelli, Milan, 1807
Alcide al bivio, cantata for voices and orchestra, Bergamo, 1809
Cantata per la morte di Haydn, cantata for tenor, voices and orchestra, Bergamo, 1809
Cantata per le nozze di Napoleone con Maria Luisa d'Austria, cantata for three voices, chorus and orchestra, text by Comte Carrara-Spinelli, Bergamo, 1810
Ferramondo, cantata for voices, chorus and orchestra, text by Comte Carrara-Spinelli, Bergamo, 1810
Cantata per la nascita del re di Roma, cantata for three voices, chorus and orchestra, Bergamo, 1811
Numa Pompilio, cantata for voices, chorus and orchestra, text by Muletti, Bergamo, 1811
Cantata per la nascita del re di Roma, cantata for soprano, harp and orchestra, Bergamo, 1811
Egeria, cantata for voices, chorus and orchestra, text by C. Arici, Brescia, 1816
Annibale, cantata for tenor and orchestra, Bergamo, 1816
Lo spavento, cantata for tenor and orchestra, Bergamo, 1816
La tempesta, cantata for tenor and orchestra, Bergamo, 1816
Le feste d'Ercole, cantata for voices, chorus and orchestra, Bergamo, 1816
L'armonia, Bergamo, 1816
Il sogno di Partenope, melodramma allegorico, text by Urbano Lampredi, Naples, 1817
Arianna e Bacco, cantata for voices, chorus and orchestra, Bergamo, 1817
Arianna in Nasso, cantata for one voice and orchestra, Naples, 1818
Cantata per la morte di Antonio Capuzzi, cantata for 2 voices, chorus and orchestra, text by Muletti, Bergamo, 1818
Inno a Pallade, text by Vincenzo Monti, Milan, 1820 (lost)
Piccola cantata, cantata for 3 voices, chorus and orchestra, Bergamo, 1822
Innalzamento al trono del giovane re Gioas, cantata for soprano, tenor, bass and orchestra, 1822
La vita campestre, cantata for tenor and orchestra, Bergamo, 1823
L'autunno, 1824
L'armonia, dramatic cantata, Bergamo, Teatro Ricciardi, 1825
Cantata per la morte di Beethoven, cantata for soprano, tenor, bass, chorus and orchestra, Bergamo, 1827
Schiera di fausti eventi, cantata for 4 voices, chorus and orchestra, Bergamo, 1838

Additionally, there were five other cantatas for several soloists, plus 31 cantatas for a single voice.

Other vocal music

40 chansons, mélodies, arias
12 Lieder (1786, Regensburg)
12 ballades vénitiennes (1797, London)
6 canzonette et duettini (Vienna)
Canzoni in Italian and German

Church music

Oratorios and sacred dramas 

Iacob a Labano fugiens, oratorio in Latin, libretto by Giuseppe Foppa, Venice, 1791
Sisara, oratorio in Latin, libretto by Giuseppe Foppa, Venice, 1793
Tobia, o Tobiae matrimonium, oratorio in Latin, Venice, 1794
La Passione, oratorio in Italian, Forlì, 1794
David in spelunca Engaddi, oratorio in Latin and Italian, for 5 female soloists, chorus and orchestra, libretto by Giuseppe Foppa, Venice, 1795
Il sagrifizio di Jefte, oratorio in Italian, Forlì, 1795 [Naxos CD 8.572719-20]
Il ritorno di Jefte, o Il voto incauto, oratorio in Italian, libretto by Jacopo Ferretti, Rome, 1814 (lost)
Gioas salvato, oratorio in Italian, Palermo, 1816-17 (lost)
Ifigenia in Tauride, azione sacra drammatica per musica in forma scenica, after Apostolo Zeno, Florence, 1817 (lost)
Samuele, oratorio in two parts in Italian, libretto by Bartolomeo Merelli, Bergamo, 1821
Atalia, dramma sacro per musica con apparato scenico, libretto by Felice Romani, Naples, 1822
San Luigi Gonzaga, oratorio in Italian, libretto by P. Cominazzi, Bergamo, 1822

Other religious music 

18 masses, including:
Mass in C' minor for soloists, chorus and orchestra, 1826
7 requiems, including:
 Grande Messa da Requiem'', 1815
43 hymns
14 antiphons
29 compositions for Holy Week
13 motets

Instrumental music

Symphonic music 

57 symphonies
2 symphony concertantes
2 concertos for pianoforte
2 ballets
3 intermezzi
3 marches

Chamber music 
3 sonatas for pianoforte and other instruments
8 sonatas à 6 for wind instruments
13 septets for wind instruments
3 octets wind instruments
2 septets for strings and wind instruments
Quintet for strings

Keyboard works  
4 sonatas
10 symphonies
58 études
10 divertimenti
Sonata for organ
2 symphonies for organ

References
Most of the information in this article is taken from the related French Wikipedia article.

 
Mayr